Dame Julie Ann Kenny  is the interim chair of the UK Commission for Employment and Skills and Chair of Trustees of the Wentworth Woodhouse Preservation Trust.

Biography
Kenny was awarded a CBE for services to industry in Yorkshire and Humberside in the 2002 New Year Honours. Julie has also served as a Deputy Lieutenant for South Yorkshire since 2005. In 2006 she was awarded an Honorary Doctorate from Sheffield Hallam University.

In 2014 Kenny was announced as the Private Businesswoman of the Year.

She was admitted as a Dame Commander of the Order of the British Empire in the 2019 Birthday Honours for services to heritage.

She was appointed a as a commissioner of Historic England by the Secretary of State for Culture Media and Sport in February 2023.

References

Living people
Dames Commander of the Order of the British Empire
Deputy Lieutenants of South Yorkshire
Officers of the Order of the British Empire
Businesspeople from Sheffield
Year of birth missing (living people)
Place of birth missing (living people)
English women in business